This is a list of people and topics appearing on the cover of Time magazine in the 1990s. Time was first published in 1923. As Time became established as one of the United States' leading news magazines, an appearance on the cover of Time became an indicator of notability, fame or notoriety.  Such features were accompanied by articles.

For other decades, see Lists of covers of Time magazine.

1990

1991

1992

1993

1994

1995

1996

1997

1998

1999

References
 Time cover search
 Time The Vault

Time magazine (1990s)
1990s
Cover of Time magazine